North Dakota Highway 91 (ND 91) is a  north–south state highway in the U.S. state of North Dakota. ND 91's southern terminus is at U.S. Route 81 (US 81) in St. Thomas, and the northern terminus is at US 81 in St. Thomas.

Major intersections

References

091
Transportation in Pembina County, North Dakota